A small intestine neuroendocrine tumor is a carcinoid in the distal small intestine or the proximal large intestine. It is a relatively rare cancer and is diagnosed in approximately 1/100000 people every year. In recent decades the incidence has increased. The prognosis is comparatively good with a median survival of more than 8 years. The disease was named by Siegfried Oberndorfer, a German pathologist, in 1907.

Signs and symptoms 
A large fraction of cases are diagnosed after routine surgery for bowel obstruction. Others may be diagnosed incidentally, or after investigation for carcinoid syndrome. The tumor typically produces serotonin, Tachykinin peptides and other substances, which cause flushing, tachycardia, diarrhea and in some cases fibrosis of the heart valves.

There are often several small and highly fibrotic tumors present in the intestine. The tumors often spread to the mesenteries and the liver.

Cause
Familial clustering of the disease, with several relatives being diagnosed may occur. Relatives of patients have an increased risk of developing the disease.

Genetics 
The tumors often harbour loss of chromosome 18q. Mutations in CDKN1B are present in approximately 8% of cases.

Treatment 
The treatment traditionally consists of a combination of medical and surgical treatment. Somatostatin analogues and Interferon decrease the secretion of hormones and the resulting symptoms. Radionuclide therapy with 177-Lutetium-DOTA-Octreotate increases progression-free survival.

Traditionally, the primary tumor has been surgically removed even in the case of metastatic disease, although this was in 2017 shown not to improve survival in asymptomatic patients.

References 

Gastrointestinal cancer
Neuroendocrinology